Kate Charlesworth (born 1950) is a British cartoonist and artist who has produced comics and illustrations since the 1970s. Her work has appeared in LGBT publications such as The Pink Paper, Gay News, Strip AIDS, Dyke's Delight, and AARGH, as well as The Guardian, The Independent, and New Internationalist. Lesbian and Gay Studies: A Critical Introduction (Bloomsbury Publishing) calls her a "notable by-and-for lesbian" cartoonist.

In 2015, her graphic novel Sally Heathcote: Suffragette (with Mary and Bryan Talbot) was included in a list published by The Guardian of the "top 10 books about revolutionaries". Sensible Footwear: A Girl’s Guide, her autobiography and history of gay and lesbian culture in England and Scotland from the end of World War II to the present, was published in 2018.

Early life 
Charlesworth was born in Barnsley, Yorkshire, England in 1950 to Joan and Harold Charlesworth. Her parents ran a local corner shop during her childhood. She attended Wombwell High School in Barnsley and attended Manchester College of Art and Design to study graphics and stage design from 1968 to 1973.

Charlesworth is an only child.

Career 
Charlesworth's career in comics began in 1973, when she pitched a daily strip called "Twice Nightly" with two gay characters and suffragette themes to the Manchester Evening News. The strip ran for six months. In 1976 she moved to London, after which she was published in gay and lesbian newspapers including The Pink Paper, Gay News, and Sappho, LGBT comic books including Strip AIDS, Dyke's Delight, and AARGH, and mainstream publications like The Guardian and City Limits. Her strips and cartoons often addressed contemporary issues in the lesbian and wider LGBT communities, including presentation, socio-political issues including oppressive legislation, and stereotypes in a humorous manner. In 1995 her work appeared in Dyke’s Delight issues 1 and 2, introducing some of her most popular characters, including Auntie Studs, to an American audience.

She has produced science comics for New Scientist ("Life, the Universe and (Almost) Everything") and The Independent, as well as illustrations for several books published by the National Museums of Scotland.

She describes her art style as not overly cartoonish or caricature, but emotionally realistic. In an interview she stated that she uses photographic reference and tries to get in the mind of each character to accurately portray their emotions on the page.

More recently, Charlesworth has shifted to working on graphic novels. She illustrated Sally Heathcote: Suffragette by Mary Talbot, published in 2014. Her illustrations were highly praised by Neel Mukherjee in The Guardian as "beautifully executed in black-and-white, with perfectly judged touches of colour." In 2011 she contributed to Blank Slate’s Nelson, a collaborative graphic novel with 54 British comic artists. Nelson was chosen as The Guardians graphic novel of the month by Rachel Cooke and one of 2011's best graphic novels by The Times. Charlesworth spent four years working on her autobiographical work Sensible Footwear: A Girl's Guide, which was published in 2019.

Charlesworth has also worked as a storyboard artist for shows including Bob the Builder (Hot Animation), Pingu (Hot Animation), and Timmy Time (Aardman Animations). She has created several cards for Cath Tate Cards, run by fellow cartoonist and friend Cath Tate. She created the CD cover for Fast Talk  by Kay Grant and Alex Ward. She also produces various forms of 3-D art, including birthday cards, maps, board games, and shadow boxes, featured on her website.

Her future plans include a joint comic project with her partner, Dianne, as well as moving into different mediums, including animation.

Personal life 
Charlesworth is a lesbian and has stated that she embraced her identity as a dyke in college when she entered a relationship. She has opined that she feels the lesbian community of the time heavily self-policed behavior and look, which prevented her from fully realizing her identity and influenced much of her work.

Charlesworth has been politically active in British and Scottish politics and pushes for equal rights. When Clause 28 of the Local Government Act was being pushed in 1988, aiming to ban the promotion of and education about homosexuality by local authorities, including schools, Charlesworth teamed up with Viv Quillin, Cath Jackson, and Cath Tate, three other local cartoonists, to produce a series of postcards to campaign against it. More recently, she has notably been outspoken against Brexit and President Trump, arguing that their popularity represent a backslide for LGBT rights.

She has also been involved in many efforts to increase awareness of LGBT history. In 2006 she illustrated a guide for a walking tour of 500 years of Edinburgh’s LGBT history, published by the LGBT Centre for Health and Wellbeing and Remember When. In the same year she participated in the City of Edinburgh Council's "Rainbow City" exhibition at the City Art Centre. She also participates in Edinburgh's Loud and Proud choir, which sang at Equal Marriage lobbies of the Scottish Parliament.

She currently lives with Dianne, her partner of 13 years, a dog, and a cat in the Borders in Scotland.

Awards and honors 

 Her work was included along that of Howard Cruse, Groc, Kath Jackson, and David Shenton in the 1990s in an exhibition at the Basement Gallery in London in association with Krazy Kat Theatre Company.
 Charlesworth and David Shenton had an exhibition of 50 queer-themed cartoons called "Sh(OUT): Contemporary art and Human Rights," developed with OurStory Scotland, at the Glasgow Gallery of Modern Art in 2009.
 In 2015 Sally Heathcote: Suffragette was included in a list published by The Guardian of the "top 10 books about revolutionaries".
 Charlesworth was included among 100 British women cartoonists in "The Inking Woman" exhibition at the Cartoon Museum in 2017.
 In 2019 an exhibition of Charlesworth's art from Sensible Footwear: A Girl's Guide was held by the United Kingdom European Commission at Europe House.
 Her work was acquired by Glasgow Museum for their fine arts collection in 2019.
 Charlesworth held a pop-up display at the Cartoon Museum to coincide with the release of her new book in 2019.
 Sensible Footwear: A Girl's Guide appeared on the 2019 Portico Prize Longlist.

Bibliography

Books 

 Sensible Footwear: A Girl’s Guide (Myriad Editions, 2019), 
 Autobiography detailing Charlesworth's realization of her sexuality, her complicated relationship with her parents, and her political fight against oppression like the legislative section 28. Also a social history of British LGBT identity, experiences, and prejudices from the post-war period to the present day.
 Sally Heathcote: Suffragette (with Mary M. Talbot and Bryan Talbot; Dark Horse Comics, 2014), 
 Follows a fictional suffragette, Sally Heathcote, through the British fight for women's suffrage as she encounters famous figures like Emmeline Pankhurst and becomes more involved in the movement, including being arrested and force-fed.
 Mary Anning: A Souvenir (Lyme Regis, 1999)
 Produced by Charlesworth for the Lyme Regis Museum's 1999 exhibition on Mary Anning.
 The Cartoon History of Time (with John Gribbin; Cardinal, 1990), 
 All That...: The Other Half of History (with Marsaili Cameron; Pandora, 1986), 
 Mostly visual satirical history textbook placing women at its center.
 Exotic Species: A Field Guide to Some of Our British Gays (GMP, 1984),

Contributions

Graphic novel collaborations 

 Nelson (edited by Rob Davis and Woodrow Phoenix, Blank Slate Comics, 2011), 
 IDP: 2043 (edited by Denise Mina; Cargo Publishing, 2014) 
 "Deeds, Not Words," with Mary and Bryan Talbot, Here I Stand: Stories That Speak for Freedom (edited by Amnesty International UK; Walker Books, 2016),

Comic strips and cartoons 

 "Twice Nightly," Manchester Evening News (1973)
 "Exotic Species," Gay News (prior to 1984)
 "Claptrap," Company (1984-1985)
 “Getting Things Straight,” Strip AIDS (Willyprods/Small Time Ink Ltd, 1987)
 “28 Trivia Quiz,” AARGH (Mad Love Graphics, 1988)
 "Life, the Universe and (Almost) Everything," New Scientist (1988-2002)
 "Plain Tales from the Bar," Pink Paper (Millivres Prowler Limited, 1988–1994)
 Women Draw 1984: Sixty-Six Cartoonists Eye the Present and the Future, edited by Paula Youens and Suzanne Perkins (The Women's Press, January 1983) 
 "Media Spillage," Ariel (BBC)
 "Font & Font," The Bookseller
 “Second Class Child,” 7 Ages of Woman (Knockabout Comics, May 1990) 
 "Cartoon," Perverse Politics: Lesbian Issues (Feminist Review, 1990) 
 "Girl's Talk," with David Shenton, The Comic Book of the Facts of Life (Penguin Books, 1991) OCLC 926737462
 "Through the Veil," written by Wren Sidhe, Immaculate Deception: Dissenting Women (Fanny, 1992)
 "Low Risk Isn't No Risk," British Deaf Association (Lesbian and Gay Switchboard, 1992)
 "Naughty Little Monkeys," Pink Paper (Millivres Prowler Limited, 1992–1995)
 Cover art and "Auntie Studs: The Early Years," Dyke's Delight #1 (Knockabout Comics, 1993)
 Cover art and “Auntie Studs is Rebel Without a Cat!,” Dyke's Delight #2 (Knockabout Comics, 1994)
 "Millennium Basin," The Guardian (1994-1996)
 "Lysteria Crescent," The Independent (mid-1990s)
 "Auntie Studs, Agony Dyke," Women Out of Line (Knockabout Comics, March 1997) 
 The Worm: The Longest Comic Strip in the World, with Neil Gaiman, Alan Moore, and others (Slab-O-Concrete Publications, 1999)
 "Kate Charlesworth's guide to the Edinburgh festival," The Guardian (2004)
 "Moving On Up," with Brick Charlesworth (BBC, 2008) 
 Drawn Out and Painted Pink with David Shenton (Cath Tate Cards, 2009)
 Produced and published to go along with their Glasgow Museum of Modern Art exhibition called "Sh[OUT]: Contemporary art and Human Rights," with OurStory Scotland. The exhibition highlighted social justice
 "The feral rich- how can we help them?" New Internationalist (2013)
 “Put a Ring On It,” Diva Magazine (2014-2015)

Books (illustrations) 

 Bolton, David et al. (1989), Oxford Intensive English Courses: OK 1: Student's Book, Oxford University Press, 
 Bongo, Ali (1979), Be a Magician, Macdonald Educational, 
 Brown, Gabrielle, editor (2019), Psychoanalytic Thinking on the Unhoused Mind, Routledge, 
 Dickson, Anne (1982), A Woman In Your Own Right: Assertiveness and You, Quartet Books Limited, 
 Dickson, Anne (1985), The Mirror Within: A New Look at Sexuality, Quartet, 
 Henriques, Nikki and Anne Dickson (1986), Women on Hysterectomy: How Long Before I Can Hang-glide?, Thorsons, 
 Hopson, Barry and Mike Scally (1988), Communication: Time to Talk, Lifeskills Publishing Group, 
 Irvine, Susan (1994), Bird Facts, HMSO: National Museums of Scotland, 
 Johnston, Sue (1989), Hold On to the Messy Times, Pandora, 
 Kitchener, Andrew (1993), Escape from Extinction, HMSO: National Museums of Scotland, 
 National and Local Government Officers Association (1988), Part-time Work, NALGO
 National and Local Government Officers Association (1986), Job Sharing, NALGO
 Robinson, Richard (2006), Why the One You Fancy Never Fancies You: Murphy's Laws of Love, Constable & Robinson, 
 Summerskill, Clare (2008), We’re The Girls and Other Songs, Stories, and Monologues, Diana Pub., 
 Swinney, Geoff (1993), Fish Facts, HMSO: National Museums of Scotland, 
 Wade, Mike and Sue Mitchell (1999), On the Trail of Scotland's Past, NMS Pub.,

References

External links
 Official website
 British Cartoon Archive biography

1950 births
Living people
20th-century English women artists
21st-century English women artists
20th-century English women writers
21st-century English women writers
Alumni of Manchester Metropolitan University
British female comics artists
English cartoonists
English comics artists
English graphic novelists
English illustrators
English lesbian writers
Female comics writers
Lesbian novelists
English lesbian artists
English LGBT novelists
People from Barnsley